Green Adams (August 20, 1812 – January 18, 1884) was a lawyer, slave owner, and member and functionary of the United States Congress.  He was born in Barbourville, Kentucky in 1812.

Biography
He studied law and was admitted to the bar.  In 1839, he was elected to the Kentucky House of Representatives.  In 1844, he served as a presidential elector for the Whig Party.
He was elected as a member of the Whig Party to the United States House of Representatives from Kentucky in 1847, remaining in that capacity through 1849.  He was made a judge of the Circuit Court of Kentucky in 1851, remaining there though 1856.  In 1859, he was reelected to the United States Congress for one term on the Opposition Party ticket.  At the end of that term, in 1861, he was appointed the sixth auditor of the United States Treasury Department, remaining there through 1864.

He was a slave owner.

In Philadelphia
He later set up a legal practice in Philadelphia, Pennsylvania.  He died in Philadelphia in 1884. He is buried in West Laurel Hill Cemetery in Bala Cynwyd, Pennsylvania.

References

Sources
Who Was Who in America: Historical Volume, 1607-1896. Chicago: Marquis Who's Who, 1963.

External links

1812 births
1884 deaths
People from Barbourville, Kentucky
American people of English descent
Whig Party members of the United States House of Representatives from Kentucky
Opposition Party members of the United States House of Representatives from Kentucky
Members of the Kentucky House of Representatives
Kentucky state court judges
Clerks of the United States House of Representatives
Lawyers from Philadelphia
American slave owners
19th-century American judges
19th-century American lawyers
Burials at West Laurel Hill Cemetery